G.A. Inter School is one of the oldest boys' schools in Hajipur, Vaishali district, Bihar in India. It is located on S.D.O. Road close to the old Gandak bridge, on the bank of the Gandaki River, sometimes also called Narayani. Students from Class 6 to Class 12 study subjects such as science, arts and commerce.

History
The school was founded in 1891 with other schools like R.M.R. Seminary in Patna, mainly to teach the children of British government officials. The school has a very special place in Indian history. Students from the school took an active part in the Indian independence movement. 

Baswan Singh, a notable Gandhian freedom fighter, was an alumnus of the school. His name was given to an indoor stadium built in Hajipur city by the district administration.

Infrastructure
The school has more than 70 rooms in 65,000 sq.ft. in a two- and three-storey building. It has classrooms, laboratories, demonstration rooms, a language laboratory, community display room, auditorium, audio visual aid facilities, examination hall, common room, record room, recreation rooms and visitors' rooms. There are separate ITI labs for vocational courses run by the government of Bihar. 

Schools in Bihar
Education in Hajipur
Educational institutions established in 1891
1891 establishments in India